She Taxi  is a 2015  Malayalam language film produced by John Arogyaswamy for Abam movies. The film stars Kavya Madhavan and Anoop Menon in the lead roles along with  Sheelu Abraham, Ansiba, Tini Tom and Suraj Venjarammoodu. The film is directed by Saji Surendran. The music is composed by Bijipal. The screenplay is based on a story written by Saji Surendran.

Plot 
The film is centered around the character of Devayani a female taxi driver. She had to take up the job due to the sudden death of her father. She has several problems in her life and was on the search for something that would change her fortune. She takes a trip to Coorg with three college girls. But in parallel to this journey was another troupe, dubbed as 'the bad boys with a mission' which has Joe Joseph, KT Salman, Umesh Pisharadi undertaking a trip. These parallel journeys intersect along the way. Meanwhile during the trip they come to know that Devayani knows Joe Joseph in advance from the trip. Later it is revealed that the college girls were on a search for a valuable painting. The search for the painting takes the group to the beautiful locations of Shimla. There they face different difficulties to reach their goal.

Cast 
Anoop Menon  as Joe Joseph         
Kavya Madhavan as Devayani            
Sheelu Abraham as Meera
Suraj Venjarammoodu as TK Salman
Tini Tom As Professor
Krishna Prabha as Shraddha
Ansiba as Rupa
Idavela Babu                
 Jaffar Idukki  as Kanjav Moideen           
Ganesh Kumar  as Singham Sivadas          
 Prem Kumar as Premkumar
Noby Marcose as Umesh Pisharadi

Soundtrack 
The music is composed by Bijipal along with Vijay Yesudas and Jassie Gift.
 "Karinkallikkuyile" -Sudeep Kumar, Akhila
 "Vezhambal Mizhikal" – Vijay Yesudas
 "Run Run" – Jassie Gift, Sumi

References 

2015 films
Films about women in India
Films about taxis
2010s Malayalam-language films
Films directed by Saji Surendran